Sydne Rome (born March 17, 1951) is an American-Italian film actress. Her first name is often misspelled Sydney or Sidney.

Biography
Born in Akron, Rome grew up in a wealthy, Jewish family in Upper Sandusky, Ohio. Her father was president of a plastics corporation in the Akron area. She started her career in 1969 in the British movie Some Girls Do. She then appeared in Italian films, often playing the young, seemingly innocent American abroad, and also in Spaghetti Westerns. Subsequently she made forays into German film and television. Since the late 90s she has acted in Italian TV films and series.

At the beginnings of the 1980s, Rome became an icon of the aerobics craze and published workout videos as well as the album Aerobic Fitness Dancing, produced by Frank Farian and recorded in German, Spanish and Italian. As a singer, she recorded the single "Angelo prepotente" (1980) in Italian, English ("For You") and German ("Wozu"). She also recorded a cover version of Marty Balin's hit "Hearts".

At some point in her life, Rome's face was disfigured in a car crash.

In 1973, Rome married Emilio Lari; subsequently, she converted to Catholicism and married the gerontologist Roberto Bernabei. She has been living in her eponymous city, Rome, Italy, since the early 1970s. Bernabei and Rome have two grown children.

Selected filmography
 Some Girls Do (Ralph Thomas, 1969)
 Sundance and the Kid (Duccio Tessari, 1969)
 So Long Gulliver (1970)
 Man Called Amen (Alfio Caltabiano, 1972)
 What? (Roman Polanski, 1972)
  (Merry-Go-Round, Otto Schenk, 1973) 
 Creezy (Pierre Granier-Deferre, 1974)
 The Gamecock (La Sculacciata, Pasquale Festa Campanile, 1974)
 Order to Kill (Josè Gutiérrez Maesso, 1975)
 That Lucky Touch (Christopher Miles, 1975)
  (1975)
 Wanted: Babysitter (René Clément, 1975)
  (Jochen Richter, 1975)
 The Twist (Claude Chabrol, 1976)
 Sex with a Smile (Sergio Martino, 1976)
 Il mostro (Luigi Zampa, 1977)
 Moi, fleur bleue (Éric Le Hung, 1977)
 Formula 1 La febbre della velocità (Speed Fever, Mario Morra 1978)
 Just a Gigolo (Schöner Gigolo, armer Gigolo, David Hemmings, 1979)
 The Pumaman (L'Uomo puma, Alberto De Martino, 1980)
  (Walter Bockmayer/ Rolf Buehrmann, 1981)
 Red Bells  (Sergei Bondarchuk, 1982)
 Red Bells II  (Sergei Bondarchuk, 1983)
 Romanza final (Gayarre) (José María Forqué, 1986)
 In the Heat of the Night (ep. Who Was Geli Bendl?, 1994)
 Padre Pio: Between Heaven and Earth (TV, 2000)
  (TV, 2000)
 Saint Rita (TV, Giorgio Capitani, 2004) 
 Callas e Onassis (TV, Giorgio Capitani, 2005) 
 The Hideout (2007)
 Il figlio più piccolo  (The Youngest Son, Pupi Avati, 2010)
 Il cuore grande delle ragazze (Pupi Avati, 2011)

References

External links

1951 births
Living people
American expatriates in Italy
American film actresses
American television actresses
Jewish American actresses
Italian film actresses
Italian television actresses
Actresses from Akron, Ohio
Expatriate actresses in Italy
American emigrants to Italy
Catholics from Ohio
Converts to Roman Catholicism from Judaism
Italian Roman Catholics
People from Upper Sandusky, Ohio